William Ellixson House is a historic home and national historic district located at Wilbourns, Granville County, North Carolina.  It was built about 1800, and is a 1 1/2-story, small Georgian / Federal style frame dwelling.  It has a cut stone foundation, steeply pitched gable roof, and double-shouldered brick exterior end chimneys.  Also on the property are the contributing packhouse and two log tobacco barns.

It was listed on the National Register of Historic Places in 1988.

References

Tobacco buildings in the United States
Farms on the National Register of Historic Places in North Carolina
Historic districts on the National Register of Historic Places in North Carolina
Georgian architecture in North Carolina
Federal architecture in North Carolina
Houses completed in 1800
Houses in Granville County, North Carolina
National Register of Historic Places in Granville County, North Carolina